The Flower District of Downtown Los Angeles is a six block floral marketplace, consisting of nearly 200 wholesale flower dealers, located within the LA Fashion District. What started almost 100 years ago as a small flower mart near Santa Monica, California, has grown into the United States' largest wholesale flower district in its current downtown location. The Market is open very early in the morning, Monday - Saturday, and closes in the early afternoon. Every commercially available cut flower can be purchased there.

History 
In the early 1900s, Los Angeles area flower farmers drove their horse-drawn wagons to the downtown Los Angeles produce market to sell their flowers. In 1905, James Vawter, a prominent Santa Monica grower of carnations, established on Spring Street the first dedicated flower market. By 1910, the local Japanese American farmers (54 Issei, first generation Japanese) had organized a flower market, which they incorporated in January 1912. It became known as the Southern California Flower Market and was located for a time at 421 Wall Street.

Within a few years after, the European immigrants, who could not participate in the Japanese-American flower market, began to come together to offer their locally grown flowers for sale to florists and nursery owners. They organized around 1917 and incorporated in January 1921 as the American Florists' Exchange dba Los Angeles Flower Market. Their first market was on Winston Street between Fourth and Fifth streets.

Eventually, both markets relocated to larger quarters in the 700 block of South Wall Street in Los Angeles, where they operate today as the core of the country's largest flower district. Since those early days, both markets have expanded and modernized and organized together as the Los Angeles Flower District. Several storefront businesses on Wall Street and San Julian Street are also included in the District. The District offers a "badge program" for member florists, event planners and others who qualify to purchase goods at wholesale prices which in 2009 included some 4,500 members.

In the 1990s and early 2000s, dozens of small flower malls and shops came downtown to do business near the renowned, historic Los Angeles Flower District; they consider themselves part of the District. Today, the general public shops throughout the area for its flowers and floral supply products alongside the retail florists and wedding and event planners. The District stretches from San Pedro Street west to Maple Street, from Seventh Street south to Ninth Street. But the two historic, major markets built the strong foundation of trust and quality through tenant-wholesalers who have supplied and shipped fresh flowers to customers across America for almost 100 years.

A prominent area to check out here is the California Flower Mall. The California Flower Mall is in the heart of the Los Angeles, Flower District. More than 50 vendors provide floral industry professionals and the general public with exotic blooms from all corners of the earth.

The flower district has made plans to renovate and expand in its business. The plan is to build a 15-story building next to the warehouses where the flower markets are held in now. It would be the southern half of the property, where maple street and 7th street lie. The 15-story building would include 323 residential unit. That would take up the top 12 stories and the rest would be for office space, retail space, wholesale market space and restaurants. The project is said to finish hopefully in 2019.

References

Bibliography
Hirahara, Naomi. A Scent of Flowers Southern California Flower Growers (2004)
Ridgway, Peggi and Works, Jan. Sending Flowers to America: Stories of The Los Angeles Flower Market and the People Who Built an American Floral Industry American Florists' Exchange (2008)

External links
 Official site 
 Flower district
 California Flower Mall

Economy of Los Angeles
Flower markets
Retail markets in the United States
Districts of Downtown Los Angeles
Floral industry